Objecto Quasi is a Portuguese collection of short stories by author José Saramago published in 1978.

It was translated to English in 2012 under the title The Lives of Things

In 2010, a cinema adaptation of one of its stories was released under the name Embargo. In "The Chair", a dictator's seat is slowly being eroded until he collapses on the floor – a clear reference to the fall of Salazar, the Portuguese dictator. In the stories, men and things form the world, whose dynamics are shaken by distance or disunity.

References

External links 
 

Short stories by José Saramago
1978 short story collections